Sonya Balmores (born June 23, 1986) is an American actress, model, and surfer from Kalaheo, Hawaii who also competed in the Miss Teen USA pageant.

Early life and education
Balmores was born to a Filipino father and a mother of Irish and Native American descent. She attended Kalaheo Elementary School and graduated from Kauai High School. She was a visual communications student at Hawaii Pacific University.

Modeling career
Balmores won the Miss Hawaii Teen USA title on May 16, 2004 at the Waikiki Sheraton Resort. Balmores represented Hawaii in the Miss Teen USA 2004 pageant held in Palm Springs, California on August 6, 2004. She placed first runner-up in the pageant, which was won by Miss Louisiana Teen USA Shelley Hennig. This was Hawaii's highest placement in the pageant since Kelly Hu won in 1985.

In 2005, Balmores appeared on the covers of Women's Health, Outside and Foam magazines.

Acting career
Balmores played the series regular role Kai Kealoha in Beyond the Break on The N, a series previously given the tentative title Boarding School. She also played the main antagonist, Malina Birch, in the 2011 film Soul Surfer. In 2014, she guest starred on Hawaii Five-0 as tour bus robber Alana Duncan the episode " Kanalu Hope Loa" or "The Last Break". In 2017, Balmores was cast in the series Inhumans as Auran.

Filmography

References

External links

Miss Teen USA official profile 

Living people
1986 births
People from Kauai County, Hawaii
2004 beauty pageant contestants
21st-century Miss Teen USA delegates
American television actresses
American Christians
American actresses of Filipino descent
American people who self-identify as being of Native American descent
American people of Irish descent